Castlelost West is a townland in County Westmeath, Ireland. The townland is located in the civil parish of the same name. The R446 regional road runs through the south of the area. The townland of Castlelost lies to the east and contains the town of Rochfortbridge. The town of Tyrrellspass stands to the west of the townland.

The townland is bordered by Castlelost to the east, Clontytallon, and Kilbride to the north, Gneevebane, and Oldtown to the south, and Piercetown to the west.

West House 
A two-story 18th Century house stands in the townland, dating back to c1760. Other historic houses in the area include Far View House, dating back to 1820

See also 

 Castlelost
 Castlelost (civil parish)
 Rochfortbridge

References 

Townlands of County Westmeath